The Senate Commerce Subcommittee on Communications, Media, and Broadband is a subcommittee within the Senate Committee on Commerce, Science and Transportation. It was renamed from the Senate Commerce Subcommittee on Communications, Technology, Innovation, and the Internet at the start of the 117th Congress. Prior to the 111th Congress, it was known as the Senate Commerce Subcommittee on Science, Technology, and Innovation.

Jurisdiction
The Subcommittee on Communications, Technology, and the Internet has jurisdiction over legislation, Congressional action, and other matters relating to communications. For these purposes, "communications" includes telephones, cell phones, the Internet, commercial and noncommercial television, cable, satellite broadcast, satellite communications, wireline and wireless broadband, radio, consumer electronic equipment associated with such services, and public safety communications.

The Subcommittee also is responsible for oversight of the Federal Communications Commission (FCC), the Corporation for Public Broadcasting (CPB), and the National Telecommunications and Information Administration (NTIA) at the Department of Commerce, which is the administration primarily responsible for the management of government spectrum and advising the President on telecommunications policy.

Members, 118th Congress

Historical subcommittee rosters

117th Congress

116th Congress

References

External links
Committee on Commerce, Science and Transportation website, Subcommittee page

Commerce Communications